Dr. Shu-Hong Zhu is a Chinese scientist living in the United States. He is best known for his pioneering research on the effectiveness of telephone based treatment for tobacco cessation (quitline).

References
Zhu S-H, Anderson CM, Tedeschi GJ, et al. Evidence of real-world effectiveness of a telephone quitline for smokers. N Engl J Med 2002;347(14):1087-93.
California Smokers Helpline

Chinese scientists
Living people
American people of Chinese descent
University of California, San Diego faculty
American scientists
20th-century Chinese scientists
21st-century Chinese scientists
20th-century American scientists
21st-century American scientists
Year of birth missing (living people)